C48 is a short secondary route in the Caprivi Strip, Namibia. It terminates at Divundu in the north, and at the Botswanan-Namibian border in the south.

References 

Roads in Namibia